Since Utah became a U.S. state in 1896, it has sent congressional delegations to the United States Senate and United States House of Representatives. Each state elects two senators to serve for six years. Before the Seventeenth Amendment in 1913, senators were elected by the Utah State Legislature. Members of the House of Representatives are elected to two-year terms, one from each of Utah's four congressional districts. Before becoming a state, the Territory of Utah elected a non-voting delegate at-large to Congress from 1850 to 1896.

57 people have served either the Territory or State of Utah: 14 in the Senate, 41 in the House, and 2 in both houses. The average term for senators has been 15.3 years and the average term for representatives has been 6.7 years. The longest-serving senator was Orrin Hatch, from 1977 to 2019. The longest-serving representative is James V. Hansen, in office for 22 years from 1981 to 2003. No Utah women have served in the Senate, but four women - Reva Beck Bosone, Karen Shepherd, Enid Greene and Mia Love - have been Representatives.

The current dean of the Utah delegation is Senator Mike Lee, having served in Congress since 2011.

U.S. Senate

Each state elects two senators by statewide popular vote every six years. The terms of the two senators are staggered so that they are not elected in the same year. Utah's senators are elected in the years from classes 1 and 3. Senators were originally chosen by the Utah House of Representatives until the Seventeenth Amendment came into force in 1913.

There have been seventeen senators elected from Utah, of whom five have been Democrats and twelve have been Republicans. Utah's current senators are Republicans Mike Lee, in office since 2011, and Mitt Romney, in office since 2019.

U.S. House of Representatives

Current representatives

Delegates from Utah Territory
The Territory of Utah was an organized incorporated territory of the United States formed on September 9, 1850. The territory initially consisted of present-day Utah, most of Nevada, and portions of Colorado and Wyoming. On February 28, 1861, the creation of Colorado Territory took land from the eastern side of Utah Territory. Nevada Territory was organized from the western section of Utah Territory on March 2, 1861. Also on that date, Nebraska Territory gained area from the northeastern part of Utah Territory. Nevada Territory gained area from Utah Territory on July 14, 1862, and again on May 5, 1866, after becoming a state. Wyoming Territory was created on July 25, 1868, from Nebraska Territory, taking more area from the northeast corner and giving Utah Territory its final borders.

The territorial delegates were elected to two-year terms. Delegates were allowed to serve on committees, debate, and submit legislation, but were not permitted to vote on bills. Delegates only served in the House of Representatives as there was no representation in the Senate until Utah became a state.

Representatives from the State of Utah
Members of the House of Representatives are elected every two years by popular vote within a congressional district. From 1895 till 1913, Utah had an at-large congressional district that represented the entire state. Every ten years, the number of congressional districts is reapportioned based on the state's population as determined by the United States census; Utah has had four districts since 2013.

See also

List of United States congressional districts
Utah's congressional districts 
Political party strength in Utah

Notes

References
General

Specific

External links

United States House of Representatives
United States Senate

Politics of Utah
Utah
 
 
United States Congressional Delegation